Hanworth is a village and a civil parish in the English county of Norfolk. The nearest railway station is Gunton on a branch line, the Bittern Line, commencing at Norwich. Norwich International Airport is closer to the city. The parish had in 2001 and 2011 a population of 169 people. The primary local government authorities are North Norfolk and for education, social care and much infrastructure Norfolk County Council.

History
The villages name means 'Hagena's enclosure'.

Hanworth has an entry in the Domesday Book of 1086. In the great book, Hanworth is recorded by the name Hagan(a)worda; the main landholder being Roger Bigot. The survey also mentions that there were two mills, 8 beehives, 5 cobs and 24 cattle.

Tudor period
Through most of the Tudor century (at least from the 1509 start of the reign of Henry VIII) the principal landowner of the parish was the Doughty family. The family home, Hanworth Hall was where they lived and were engaged as agricultural landlords until succession to more distant heirs at the end of the 18th century. The hall was rebuilt after a fire in 1686. In the park (proper demesne itself) is a notable Spanish chestnut tree believed to pre-date 1714.

Church of Saint Bartholomew

The parish church of Saint Bartholomew dates from the 14th century but parts of the building date from an earlier building. On the outside north wall of the chancel , there are traces of Saxon windows. On the eastern elevation, the east window dates from between 1290 and 1350. The nave and south aisles are of a later date. The windows are Perpendicular in style and date from between 1350 and 1530, and small pieces of medieval stained glass can be seen in the top lights. The clerestory has an unusual arrangement of two windows to each arch. The tower is constructed from flint and has traceried sound holes and was built in the 15th century. The tower houses five bells. The font dates from before the present church and has a large bowl supported by four plain pillars. Hanging over the chancel arch there are the royal arms of Queen Anne (1702–1714) which were adopted by the crown after the union of England and Scotland in 1707. The church organ was built around 1865 by 'Father' Henry Willis, the famous London organ builder. It originally cost £70 and is the only miniature Father Willis organ in Norfolk.

Common 

Hanworth Common lies between Cromer and Aylsham in North Norfolk. The name is derived from Hagana (the Dane who invaded Norfolk in 870 AD, and whose name was anglicised to Han), and 'worth' meaning waters, which relates to the two streams that enclose the parish - Hagon Beck and Scarrow Beck. The Weavers' Way from Cromer to Great Yarmouth runs through the village.

The common covers  protected by cattle grids – it is relatively large for East Anglia and one of few that survive in the ownership of all of the residents of a zone, outside of a few National Parks and Areas of Outstanding Natural Beauty, such as the New Forest.

The first maps of Hanworth Common go back to 1628, when the Doughty family bought the Manor of Hanworth from the Duke of Norfolk. They bought more land from his kinsman the Earl of Surrey (a junior branch of the Howard family) in 1690. At the time, there were three commons - Bell House Common, Hook Hill Common and Barn Stable Common - together, Hanworth Green.

The common has been managed (including letting of the grazing) by a committee of residents since at least 1909, the earliest minutes that are held. In 1972, Hanworth Common was registered under the Commons Registration Act 1965, and, as there was no known owner, Possessory Title was granted to the Hanworth Commons Management Committee in 1974. About 30 cattle now graze the common from May to October.

In late 2004, Robert, the youngest son of the Anthony Philip Harbord-Hamond, 11th Baron Suffield, claimed ownership of the common thereby attempting to charge the owners of animals grazing there. In October 2006 a court rejected this – ruling that the land belonged to the people of the village by virtue of adverse possession.

Historic economic demography 

From 1801 to 1851 at decennial censuses the population hovered between 246 and 267 inhabitants. At those thereafter the population was significantly fewer. Figures can appear confusing due to an acreage gain (see above) hence on the ground falling from a nominal (taking account of the once external, gained zone) total of "282 as of 1931" to 250 in 1951, then similarly sharply - to 196 - in 1961. In the early 19th century professional artists (including Humphry Repton and John Sell Cotman) came to paint Hanworth Common. It hosted many businesses: a dressmaker, stonemason, blacksmith and wood carver. The blacksmith's was destroyed by a Luftwaffe bomb in 1940, the year of the Battle of Britain.

References

http://kepn.nottingham.ac.uk/map/place/Norfolk/Hanworth

External links

Hanworth Common

Villages in Norfolk
Civil parishes in Norfolk
North Norfolk